Carrollton is the name of the following places in the U.S. state of Indiana:
Carrollton, Carroll County, Indiana
Carrollton, Hancock County, Indiana